Hacıdervişler is a village in the Bayramiç District of Çanakkale Province in Turkey. Its population is 70 (2021). Hacıdervişler is situated northwest of Söğütgediği.

References

Villages in Bayramiç District